Polonium tetranitrate is an inorganic compound, a salt of polonium and nitric acid with the chemical formula Po(NO3)4. The compound is radioactive, forms white crystals.

Synthesis
Dissolution of metallic polonium in concentrated nitric acid:

Physical properties
Polonium(IV) nitrate forms white or colorless crystals.

Dissolves in water with hydrolysis.

Chemical properties
It disproportionates in aqueous weakly acidic nitric acid solutions:

Polonium ion (2+) is oxidized with nitric acid to polonium (4+).

References

Polonium compounds
Nitrates